Izbrannoe (Russian: Избранное; English: Favorites) is an extended play by Russian girl group Serebro, released internationally on March 2, 2010 by Monolit Records and Symbolic Records through iTunes. It was produced by Maxim Fadeev.

Background
Serebro announced that they would release the EP on iTunes on March 2, 2010. The extended play features 5 songs, including their first new release after OpiumRoz, and after Marina Lizorkina's departure, "Сладко" along with a remix and an English version titled "Like Mary Warner". The other songs are "Опиум" (2008) and a remix of "Скажи, не молчи", both singles were released previously on the group's debut album.

Track listing

References

2010 debut EPs
Serebro albums